"Don't Get Me Started" is a song by German recording artist Jessica Wahls. It was written by Peter Kvint and Emma Holland, and produced by Joakim "Jock-E" Björklund. Her second solo single, it was released by Cheyenne Records and Polydor Island on August 9, 2004, in German-speaking Europe. "Don't Get Me Started" debuted and peaked at number 51 on the German Singles Chart.

Track listings

Personnel and credits 
Credits adapted from the liner notes of "Don't Get Me Started."

 Helena Gutarra – backing vocals
 Emma Holland – writing
 Peter Kvint – backing vocals, electric guitar, writing

 Joakim "Jock-E" Björklund – instruments, mixing, production
 Pelle Siren – guitar
 Jessica Wahls – backing vocals, lead vocals

Charts

Release history

References

2004 songs
Polydor Records singles
Songs written by Peter Kvint